Methylobacterium aquaticum  is a bacterium from the genus of Methylobacterium which has been isolated from drinking water in Seville in Spain.

References

Further reading

External links
Type strain of Methylobacterium aquaticum at BacDive -  the Bacterial Diversity Metadatabase

Hyphomicrobiales
Bacteria described in 2005